Clue is a 1985 American black comedy mystery film based on the board game of the same name. Directed by Jonathan Lynn, who co-wrote the script with John Landis, and produced by Debra Hill, it stars the ensemble cast of Eileen Brennan, Tim Curry, Madeline Kahn, Christopher Lloyd, Michael McKean, Martin Mull, Lesley Ann Warren, and Colleen Camp.

Inspired by the nature of the board game, the film's initial release featured various different endings, with one of three possibilities sent to each theater. Home media releases include all three endings presented sequentially. The film initially received mixed reviews and did poorly at the box office, grossing $14.6 million in the United States against its budget of $15 million, but later developed a considerable cult following.

Plot
In 1954, six strangers arrive by ominous invitation at a secluded New England mansion, despite most of the guests being from the Washington, D.C., metropolitan area. Greeted by Wadsworth the butler and Yvette the maid, each guest receives a pseudonym to maintain confidentiality: Colonel Mustard, Mrs. White, Mrs. Peacock, Mr. Green, Professor Plum, and Miss Scarlet.

A seventh guest arrives, Mr. Boddy, who Wadsworth reveals has been blackmailing the others. Mrs. Peacock is accused of taking bribes for her husband, a U.S. senator, but denies any wrongdoing and claims she has paid the blackmail to keep the scandal quiet. Mrs. White is suspected in the death of her husband, a nuclear physicist; she denies guilt and says that she does not want the allegations made public. Professor Plum has lost his medical license due to an affair with a patient, which he initially denies. Miss Scarlet runs an underground brothel in Washington, D.C., of which she is unashamed. Colonel Mustard, though initially suspected of being one of Miss Scarlet's clients, is actually a war profiteer who sold plane parts on the black market, resulting in several deaths. Mr. Green is homosexual, which he is not ashamed of, but must keep secret as it would cost him his job at the State Department if discovered.

Wadsworth tells them that the police had been notified and they have approximately 45 minutes before they arrive. While threatening to expose the guests if he is arrested, Mr. Boddy gives them each a weapon—a candlestick for Miss Scarlet, a knife for Mrs. Peacock, a lead pipe for Mr. Green, a revolver for Professor Plum, a rope for Mrs. White, and a wrench for Colonel Mustard—and suggests that someone kill Wadsworth, who has the key to the front door and whose death will ensure that "no one but the seven of us will ever know" of their secrets. Mr. Boddy turns out the lights; deathly moans are heard and a gunshot rings out, and when the lights are turned back on, Mr. Boddy is apparently dead, without any indication at first glance as to how.

As the guests investigate Boddy's death, Wadsworth explains to them that his wife committed suicide due to Mr. Boddy's blackmail because she refused to name friends who were socialists, forcing him to become Boddy's butler, and that he has summoned the guests to force a confession out of Mr. Boddy and turn him over to the police. The group suspects the cook, but they find her dead as well, stabbed with the knife. Mr. Boddy's body disappears, but the guests find it, now bleeding, in the restroom, having been struck on the head with the candlestick.

Wadsworth locks the weapons in a cupboard. Before he can throw the key out the front door, a stranded motorist arrives, and Wadsworth locks him in the lounge. Wadsworth proceeds to throw a key out the front door. While the guests search the mansion in pairs, an unknown person burns the blackmail evidence, unlocks the cupboard and kills the motorist with the wrench. Discovering a secret passage, Colonel Mustard and Miss Scarlet find themselves locked in the lounge with the motorist's corpse until Yvette shoots the door open with the revolver.

A police officer investigating the motorist's abandoned car arrives to use the phone. The mansion receives a call from FBI chief J. Edgar Hoover, which Wadsworth takes alone. After distracting the police officer successfully, the guests resume their search until another unknown person turns off the electricity. Yvette, the police officer, and a singing telegram woman who arrived while the lights were out are murdered with the rope, lead pipe, and revolver, respectively.

Wadsworth and the others regroup after he turns the electricity back on, and he says he knows who the murderer is. Recreating the night's events, Wadsworth explains that the five other victims were Mr. Boddy's informants, each with a connection to one of the guests: the cook used to be Peacock's; the cop was being bribed by Scarlet; the motorist was Mustard's driver during World War II; Yvette was one of Scarlet's call girls, who had an affair with White's husband; and the singing telegram was the patient with whom Professor Plum had an affair. An evangelist interrupts the gathering, but Mrs. Peacock turns him away by slamming the door. Wadsworth continues his explanation, with one of three possible outcomes.

How It Might Have Happened
Yvette murdered the cook with the knife and Mr. Boddy with Miss Scarlet's candlestick on orders from Miss Scarlet, who then killed Yvette and the other victims. Planning to sell the guests' secrets, Scarlet prepares to shoot Wadsworth, who asserts there are no more bullets, causing them to bicker over how many shots there have been, and disarms Scarlet as law enforcement raid the house. When Wadsworth asks where the chief of police is, it is revealed that he has been posing as the evangelist. The chief of police congratulates Wadsworth, revealed to be an undercover FBI agent. Wadsworth attempts to demonstrate the revolver was empty, but a remaining bullet is revealed when he shoots the rope holding a chandelier. As he starts doing the math, the chandelier falls narrowly missing Colonel Mustard.

How About This?
Mrs. Peacock killed all the victims to conceal that she took bribes from foreign powers. She holds the others at gunpoint as they allow her to leave. Outside, she is surprised by the evangelist who knew her name as he reveals that he is the chief of police. The police emerge and arrest her. Now revealed to be an undercover FBI agent sent to investigate her while being congratulated by the chief of police, Wadsworth asks again whether anyone would care for fruit or dessert.

Here's What Really Happened
Professor Plum missed Mr. Boddy with the revolver, but later killed him in the hall with the candlestick. Mrs. Peacock stabbed the cook in the kitchen with the knife. Colonel Mustard bludgeoned the motorist with the wrench in the lounge. Mrs. White throttled Yvette in the billiards room with the rope out of jealousy and hatred for the latter's affair with the former's husband, whom Mrs. White had also killed. Miss Scarlet clubbed the cop in the library with the lead pipe. When Mr. Green is suspected of shooting the singing telegram girl, he states that he didn't do it, the revolver is missing, and whoever has it shot her. Wadsworth draws Professor Plum's revolver stating that he shot her and reveals that he is the real Mr. Boddy. When Professor Plum asks who he really shot, Mr. Boddy states that it was his expendable butler. With his spies and informants disposed of, Mr. Boddy plans to continue blackmailing the guests until Mr. Green then draws another revolver, kills Mr. Boddy, reveals that he is an undercover FBI agent, and that the call from Hoover was for him. He opens the front door to bring in the authorities to arrest the others. Revealed to have posed as the evangelist, the chief of police asks who did it. The other guests begin pointing at each other before Mr. Green clarifies that they are all responsible for the respective deaths, but he then states that he was the one who killed Mr. Boddy "in the hall with the revolver." After being patted on the shoulder by the chief of police, Mr. Green declares, "Okay, Chief, take 'em away! I'm gonna go home and sleep with my wife!"

Cast

 Eileen Brennan as Mrs. Peacock, the wife of a U.S. senator accused of taking bribes
 Tim Curry as Wadsworth, a butler who once worked for Mr. Boddy and is seeking justice for his wife. In two of the endings, he is an undercover FBI agent. In the third ending, he is the true Mr. Boddy.
 Madeline Kahn as Mrs. White, the widow of a nuclear physicist, an illusionist, and three other men. All five died under suspicious circumstances. 
 Christopher Lloyd as Professor Plum, a disgraced former psychiatrist working for the World Health Organization.
 Michael McKean as Mr. Green, a State Department employee who is a closeted homosexual.  In one of the endings, he is actually an undercover FBI agent.
 Martin Mull as Colonel Mustard, a war profiteer implied to be a client of Miss Scarlet's service
 Lesley Ann Warren as Miss Scarlet, a sassy Washington, D.C. madam
 Colleen Camp as Yvette, a voluptuous maid who formerly worked as a call girl for Miss Scarlet and was mistress to one of Mrs. White's husbands
 Lee Ving as Mr. Boddy, a man who has been blackmailing the six guests of Hill House and Wadsworth's wife. He is revealed to be the true Mr. Boddy's butler in one of the three endings.
 Bill Henderson as The Cop, an unnamed police officer whom Miss Scarlet has been bribing
 Jeffrey Kramer as The Motorist, Colonel Mustard's driver during World War II
 Kellye Nakahara as The Cook (Mrs. Ho), the former cook of Mr. Boddy and of Mrs. Peacock
 Jane Wiedlin as The Singing Telegram Girl, a former patient of Professor Plum with whom he had an affair
 Howard Hesseman as The Evangelist / The Chief (uncredited), the unnamed chief of police who poses as an evangelist in all three endings

Production

Development
The multiple-ending concept was developed by John Landis, who claimed in an interview to have invited playwright Tom Stoppard, writer and composer Stephen Sondheim, and actor Anthony Perkins to write the screenplay. The script was ultimately finished by director Jonathan Lynn.

Scrapped ending
A fourth ending was filmed, but Lynn removed it because, he later said, "It really wasn't very good. I looked at it, and I thought, 'No, no, no, we've got to get rid of that.'" In that ending, Wadsworth committed all the murders. He was motivated by his desire for perfection. Having failed to be either the perfect husband or the perfect butler, he decided to be the perfect murderer instead. Wadsworth reports that he poisoned the champagne the guests drank so they would soon die, leaving no witnesses. The police and the FBI arrive and Wadsworth is arrested. He breaks free and steals a police car, but his escape is thwarted when three police dogs lunge from the back seat. This ending is documented in Clue: The Storybook, a tie-in book released in conjunction with the film.

Casting
Carrie Fisher was originally cast to portray Miss Scarlet, but withdrew to enter treatment for drug and alcohol addiction. Jonathan Lynn's first choice for Wadsworth was Leonard Rossiter, but he died before filming commenced. The second choice was Rowan Atkinson, but it was decided that he was not sufficiently well known at the time, so Tim Curry was cast.

Filming
Clue was filmed on sound stages at the Paramount Pictures film studios in Hollywood. The set design is credited to Les Gobruegge, Gene Nollmanwas, and William B. Majorand, with set decoration by Thomas L. Roysden. To decorate the interior sets, authentic 18th- and 19th-century furnishings were rented from private collectors, including the estate of Theodore Roosevelt. After completion, the set was bought by the producers of Dynasty, who used it as the fictional hotel The Carlton.

All interior scenes were filmed at the Paramount lot, except the ballroom scene. The ballroom, as well as the driveway gate exteriors, were filmed on location at a mansion in South Pasadena, California. This site was destroyed in a fire on October 5, 2005. Exterior shots of the Pasadena mansion were enhanced with matte paintings to make the house appear much larger; these were executed by matte artist Syd Dutton in consultation with Albert Whitlock.

Madeline Kahn improvised Mrs. White's famous "flames" speech.

Release
The film was released theatrically on December 13, 1985. Each theater received one of the three endings, and some theaters announced which ending the viewer would see.

Novelizations
The novelization is by Michael McDowell, based on the screenplay. Landis, Lynn, and Ann Matthews wrote a children's adaptation, Paramount Pictures Presents Clue: The Storybook. Both adaptations were published in 1985, and differ from the film in that they feature a fourth ending cut from the film. In this ending, Wadsworth says that he killed Boddy as well as the other victims, and then reveals to the guests that he has poisoned them all so that there will be no witnesses and he will have committed the perfect crime. As he runs through the house to disable the phones and lock the doors, the chief of police – who had been posing as an evangelist – returns, followed by the police, who disarm Wadsworth. Wadsworth then repeats the confession he gave the guests, physically acting out each scene himself. When he arrives at the part about meeting Colonel Mustard at the door, he steps through the door, closes it, and locks it, leaving all the guests trapped inside. The police and guests escape through a window while Wadsworth attempts to make a getaway in a police car, only to hear the growling of a Dobermann from the back seat.

Home media
The film was released to home video in VHS format in Canada and the United States in 1986 and to other countries on February 11, 1991. It was released on DVD by Paramount Home Entertainment in June 17, 2000, and on Blu-ray by Paramount Home Media Distribution on August 7, 2012.

The home video, television broadcasts, and on-demand streaming by services such as Netflix include all three endings shown sequentially, with the first two characterized as possible endings but the third (Ending C) being the only true one. The Blu-ray and DVD offer viewers the option to watch the endings separately (chosen randomly by the player), as well as the "home entertainment version" ending with all three of them stitched together.

Soundtrack
In February 2011, La-La Land Records released John Morris's score for the film as a limited-edition soundtrack CD. In 2015, for the film's 30th anniversary, Mondo issued a limited-edition vinyl pressed on six different colored 180 Gram Vinyl colors for each of the suspects.

Reception

Critical response
The film initially received mixed reviews. Janet Maslin of The New York Times panned it, writing that the beginning "is the only part of the film that is remotely engaging. After that, it begins to drag". Similarly, Gene Siskel of the Chicago Tribune gave the film 2.5 out of 4 stars, writing, "Clue offers a few big laughs early on followed by a lot of characters running around on a treadmill to nowhere." Siskel particularly criticized the decision to release the film to theaters with three separate endings, calling it a "gimmick" that would distract audiences from the rest of the film, and concluding, "Clue is a movie that needs three different middles rather than three different endings."

Roger Ebert of the Chicago Sun-Times gave the film 2 out of 4 stars, writing that it has a "promising" cast but the "screenplay is so very, very thin that [the actors] spend most of their time looking frustrated, as if they'd just been cut off right before they were about to say something interesting." On Siskel & Ebert & the Movies, both agreed that the "A" ending was the best while the "C" ending was the worst.

On the review aggregator website Rotten Tomatoes, the film holds an approval rating of 68% based on 34 reviews, with an average rating of 6.3/10. The website's critics consensus reads, "A robust ensemble of game actors elevate Clue above its schematic source material, but this farce's reliance on novelty over organic wit makes its entertainment value a roll of the dice." On Metacritic, the film has a weighted average score of 39 out of 100 based on 11 critics, indicating "generally unfavorable reviews".

Box office
Clue has grossed $14.6 million in North America, just short of its $15 million budget.

Legacy
In addition to the cult following garnered by the film after its theatrical release, the screenplay has seen numerous stage play adaptations including one by Jonathan Lynn. Director Rian Johnson included a film poster of Clue in his edit room for the 2019 murder mystery film Knives Out.

Remake
Universal Studios announced in 2011 that a new film based on the game was being developed. The film was initially dropped, then resumed as Hasbro teamed up with Gore Verbinski to produce and direct.

In August 2016, The Tracking Board reported that Hasbro had landed at 20th Century Fox with Josh Feldman producing for Hasbro, Ryan Jones serving as the executive producer and Daria Cercek overseeing the project. The film will be a "worldwide mystery" with action-adventure elements, potentially setting up a possible franchise that could play well internationally. In January 2018, 20th Century Fox announced that Ryan Reynolds, who had established a three-year first-look deal with the studio, would star in the remake, with Rhett Reese and Paul Wernick—writers for the Reynolds-led Deadpool, its sequel, and Life—as scriptwriters. In September 2019, TheWrap reported that Jason Bateman was in talks to direct and star in the film, but was rejected shortly after. In February 2020, Deadline Hollywood reported that James Bobin was in talks with 20th Century Studios to direct the film. In August 2022, Oren Uziel was hired to rewrite the script.

In other media
 The episode of Psych titled "100 Clues" features Clue stars Martin Mull, Christopher Lloyd, and Lesley Ann Warren as suspects in a series of murders at a mansion. The episode, in addition to many jokes and themes in homage to the film, includes multiple endings in which the audience (separately for East and West Coast viewership) decides who is the real killer. The episode was dedicated to the memory of Madeline Kahn.
 Warren guest starred on a 2019 episode of Mull's sitcom The Cool Kids as a love interest for his character. At the time her role was announced in November 2018, it was largely touted by the press as a Clue reunion, though it features only Mull and Warren.
 The Family Guy episode "And Then There Were Fewer" is based on the film along with Agatha Christie's And Then There Were None.
 Who Done It: The Clue Documentary was announced in production in 2018, covering the making of the film, its rise to cult status, and interviews with many key people.
 The episode "No Clue" of the 2020 SyFy series Vagrant Queen draws heavily on the film, and the game to a lesser extent.
 The episode "Clue: SI" of the series CSI: NY makes several references to the film and game.

References

Bibliography

External links

 
 
 
 
 
 
 

Cluedo
1985 films
1985 comedy films
1985 crime films
1985 directorial debut films
1985 thriller films
1980s American films
1980s black comedy films
1980s comedy mystery films
1980s comedy thriller films
1980s crime comedy films
1980s crime thriller films
1980s English-language films
1980s mystery thriller films
1980s parody films
American black comedy films
American comedy mystery films
American comedy thriller films
American crime comedy films
American crime thriller films
American mystery thriller films
American parody films
Fiction with alternate endings
Films about adultery in the United States
Films about McCarthyism
Films based on games
Films based on Hasbro toys
Films directed by Jonathan Lynn
Films produced by Debra Hill
Films scored by John Morris
Films set in 1954
Films set in country houses
Films set in New England
Films shot in Los Angeles
Films with screenplays by John Landis
Films with screenplays by Jonathan Lynn
Murder mystery films
Paramount Pictures films
PolyGram Filmed Entertainment films